The 1959 Segunda División Peruana, the second division of Peruvian football (soccer), was played by 10 teams. The tournament winner, Mariscal Sucre was promoted to the Primera División Peruana 1960.

Results

Standings

External links
 La Historia de la Segunda 1959

Peruvian Segunda División seasons
Peru2
2